was a Japanese video game developer, best known for the Double Dragon and Kunio-kun franchises (the latter including Renegade, Super Dodge Ball and River City Ransom) as well as Karate Champ, The Combatribes and Voltage Fighter Gowcaizer. As of June 2015, Arc System Works owns the intellectual properties of Technōs Japan.

History 

Initially operating from a single-room apartment, Technōs was founded in 1981 by three staff members of Data East. Their first game was Minky Monkey, released in 1982. A few months after their foundation, a lawsuit was brought up against the company by Data East under allegations that Technos had stolen data from Data East's arcade game Pro Tennis with the intent of producing and selling a bootleg of it.  The two companies settled in August 1983 and Technos would go on to create two arcade games published by Data East, Tag Team Wrestling and Karate Champ. Technōs Japan's earlier games were published by other companies, as Technōs at the time did not have the economical resource to distribute their own games.

Nekketsu Kōha Kunio-kun ("Hot Blooded Tough Guy Kunio"), a side-scrolling beat-em-up released in 1986 about a high school student who fought thugs and delinquents from other schools, was the company's first big hit in Japan. Kunio-kun was released in the west as Renegade with the game's graphics changed to make the game marketable in the overseas market. Technōs would then produce a Nintendo Entertainment System version of the game, which would be Technōs' first game for the home console market. Technōs Japan's subsequent arcade beat-em-up, Double Dragon, was a big success worldwide when it was released in 1987, leading to the production of an NES version of the game, as well as licensed versions by other companies for various platforms.

The success of Kunio-kun led to the production of numerous spin-offs and sequels starring the same character produced for the 8-bit Family Computer platform in Japan and later for the Game Boy and Super Famicom, resulting in more than twenty games starring Kunio by the mid-1990s, many of which were rule-bending sports games. A few Kunio-kun games were localized for the North American market; namely Super Dodge Ball, River City Ransom (considered by critics to be a cult classic) and Nintendo World Cup, but none maintain any connection with each other. Technōs would attempt to remedy this by attempting to localize several Kunio-kun under the Crash 'n the Boys label, but only Crash 'n the Boys: Street Challenge was released (the game's ending features a teaser for Ice Challenge, which was unreleased).

Technōs also released two arcade sequels to Double Dragon: Double Dragon II: The Revenge in 1988 and Double Dragon 3: The Rosetta Stone in 1990 (the latter was developed by an external development team at East Technology), and produced the respective NES versions of those games, as well as Super Double Dragon in 1992, an original installment for the Super NES. An American-produced Double Dragon animated series and a live-action film were also made as well.

Outside the Double Dragon and Kunio-kun games, Technōs produced a few original games for the arcade and home markets such as U.S. Championship V'Ball, The Combatribes and Shadow Force, as well as two WWF arcade games (WWF Superstars and WWF Wrestlefest), but most of these games did not achieve the same kind of success that Kunio-kun and Double Dragon achieved. The company's last games were produced for the Neo Geo hardware, which include a Double Dragon fighting game based on the movie, their second and last fighting game Voltage Fighter Gowcaizer, and a Neo Geo sequel to Super Dodge Ball. By 1996, Technōs Japan declared bankruptcy and ceased operations. Some of the developers who worked on the Neo Geo titles (including Kengo Asai) briefly worked at Face, a former affiliate of SNK.

Post-bankruptcy
Following the closure, a licensing company named Million Co., Ltd was formed to purchase the former intellectual properties of Technōs Japan. Million continued to produce new games such as Super Dodge Ball Advance, Double Dragon Advance and River City Ransom EX for the Game Boy Advance, Super Dodgeball Brawlers for the Nintendo DS, as well as reissuing older titles via the Virtual Console and other services. In June 2015, Arc System Works acquired all intellectual properties of Technōs Japan from Million Co., Ltd.

U.S. subsidiary 
Technōs Japan had a subsidiary in the U.S. called American Technōs Inc., which was located at Cupertino, California. American Technōs was formed in 1987, shortly after the release of Double Dragon at the arcades and published all of Technōs Japan's arcade games in North America beginning with Double Dragon II: The Revenge. While the majority of Technōs Japan's console games were still licensed to other companies such as Tradewest (Double Dragon and Super Double Dragon), Acclaim Entertainment (Double Dragon II and III), CSG Imagesoft (Super Dodge Ball) and even Nintendo (Super Spike V'Ball and Nintendo World Cup), American Technōs also managed to publish a few console games, namely River City Ransom and Crash 'n the Boys: Street Challenge for the NES, Super Double Dragon (co-published with Tradewest) and The Combatribes for the Super NES, and Geom Cube for the PlayStation. American Technōs also published Super Bowling (developed by Athena)  and Super Pinball: Behind the Mask (developed by Meldac/KAZe) for the Super NES and the helicopter game Strike Point for the PlayStation. American Technōs was still operating after Technōs Japan's demise until sometime during the late 1990s. Its former president was Keiichi Iwamoto.

List of games by platforms 
All games are listed by original Japanese titles unless otherwise noted. Neo Geo games are listed separately from the other arcade games. This list does not take account licensed versions that were released by other companies (such as the Master System port of Double Dragon and the PC Engine ports of the Kunio games published by Naxat Soft)  or games that were produced by Million, the subsequent copyrights holder of Technōs Japan's former properties. Also, all of the following games are listed by their original Japanese release date.

Arcade 
 Minky Monkey: 1982
 Zeroize: 1983
 Eggs (Japanese: Scrambled Eggs): 9/1983
 Dommy: 1983
 Tag Team Wrestling (Japanese: The Big Pro-Wrestling!): 12/1983
 Karate Champ: 7/1984
 Shusse Ōzumō: 1984
 Mysterious Stones: 11/1984
 Acrobatic Dog-Fight (Japanese: Dog-Fight: Batten O'Hara no Sucharaka Kuuchuu-sen): 1984
 Bogey Manor: 1985
 Mat Mania (Japanese: Exciting Hour): 1985
 Mania Challenge: 1986
 Battle Lane Vol. 5: 1986
 Renegade (Japanese: Nekketsu Kōha Kunio-kun): 5/1986
 Xain'd Sleena (American title: Solar Warrior; European title: Soldier of Light): 11/1986
 Double Dragon: 6/1987
 Super Dodge Ball (Japanese: Nekketsu KōKō Dodgeball Bu): 11/1987
 China Gate (Japanese: Sai Yu Gou Ma Roku): 3/1988
 Double Dragon II: The Revenge: 6/1988
 U.S. Championship V'Ball: 12/1988
 WWF Superstars: 7/1989
 Block Out: 10/1989
 The Combatribes: 6/1990
 Double Dragon 3: The Rosetta Stone (developed by East Technology): 11/1990
 WWF Wrestlefest: 7/1991
 Shadow Force: 6/1993

Family Computer/Nintendo Entertainment System 
 Renegade (Japanese: Nekketsu Kōuha Kunio-kun): 4/17/1987
 Double Dragon: 4/8/1988
 Super Dodge Ball (Japanese: Nekketsu KōKō Dodgeball Bu): 7/26/1988
 River City Ransom (Japanese: Downtown Nekketsu Monogatari; PAL version: Street Gangs): 4/25/1989
 Super Spike V'Ball (Japanese: U.S. Championship V'Ball): 11/10/1989
 Double Dragon II: The Revenge: 12/22/1989
 Nintendo World Cup (Japanese: Nekketsu KōKō Dodgeball Bu Soccer Hen): 5/18/1990
 Downtown Nekketsu Kōshinkyoku Soreyuku Daiundōkai: 10/12/1990
 Double Dragon III: The Sacred Stones (Japanese: Double Dragon III: The Rosetta Stone): 2/22/1991
 Sugoro Quest: 6/28/1991
 Downtown Special: Kunio-kun no Jidaigeki dayo Zen'in Shūgō: 7/26/1991
 Ike Ike! Nekketsu Hockey Bu: Subette Koronde Dairantō (announced in the U.S. as Crash 'n the Boys: Ice Challenge, but was unreleased): 2/7/1992
 Crash 'n the Boys: Street Challenge (Japanese: Bikkuri Nekketsu Shinkiroku: Harukanaru Kin Medal): 6/26/1992
 Nekketsu Kakutō Densetsu: 12/23/1992
 Kunio-kun no Nekketsu Soccer League: 4/23/1993
 Nekketsu Street Basket: Ganbare Dunk Heroes: 12/17/1993
 Block Out : Unreleased
 Nekketsu Kunio-Kun Zukan: Unreleased
 Nekketsu Yakyuu Kozou: Unreleased
 Xain'D Sleena: Unreleased
 China Gate: Unreleased
 Double Dragon IV: Renegade: Unreleased

Game Boy 
 Double Dragon: 7/20/1990
 Double Dragon II (Japanese: Nekketsu Kōha Kunio-kun: Bangai Rantō Hen) 12/7/1990
 Nintendo World Cup (Japanese: Nekketsu Kōkō Soccer Bu: World Cup Hen): 4/26/1991
 Nekketsu Kōkō Dodgeball Bu: Kyōteki! Dodge Soldier no Maki (Game Boy version of Super Dodge Ball released only in Japan): 11/8/1991
 Downtown Nekketsu Kōshinkyoku: Dokodemo Daiundōkai: 7/24/1992
 Bikkuri Nekketsu Shinkiroku: Dokodemo Kin Medal: 7/16/1993
 Downtown Special: Kunio-kun no Jidaigeki dayo Zen'in Shūgō: 12/22/1993
 Taiyō no Tenshi Marlowe: Ohana Batake no Dai Panic!: 5/27/1994
 Nekketsu! Beach Volley dayo: Kunio-kun: 7/29/1994

Super NES/Super Famicom 
 Shodai Nekketsu Kōha Kunio-kun: 8/7/1992
 Super Double Dragon (Japanese: Return of Double Dragon): 10/16/1992
 The Combatribes: 12/23/1992
 Kunio-kun no Dodgeball dayo Zen'in Shūgō: 8/6/1993
 Downtown Nekketsu Baseball Challenge: 12/17/1993
 Shin Nekketsu Kōha: Kunio-tachi no Banka (developed by Almanic): 4/29/1994
 Kunio no Oden: 5/27/1994
 Popeye: Ijiwaru Majo Sea Hag no Maki: 8/12/1994
 Funaki Masakatsu no Hybrid Wrestler: Tōgi Denshō: 10/21/1994
 Sugoro Quest ++: Dicenics: 12/9/1994
 Dun Quest: Mashin Fūin no Densetsu: 7/21/1995
 Kunio no Bike Racing: Nekketsu Bari Bari Kouttotai: Unreleased

Game Gear 
 Popeye: Beach Volleyball: 8/12/1994

PlayStation 
 Geom Cube (3D puzzle game similar to Blockout): 12/22/1994

Neo Geo 
 Double Dragon: 2/1995
 Voltage Fighter Gowcaizer (Japanese: Chōjin Gakuen Gowcaizer): 9/1995
 Super Dodge Ball (Japanese: Kunio no Nekketsu Dodgeball Densetsu): 1996
 High Voltage 12+1: Unreleased
 Death Match: Unreleased
 DarkSeed/Dragon's Heaven (co-developed with Face): Unreleased

References

External links

 Technōs Japan Portal Website official website
 
 
 Russian Nekketsu Community
 Polish Nekketsu Community
 Nekketsu Kakutou Densetsu Community

Video game development companies
Software companies based in Tokyo
Video game companies established in 1981
Video game companies disestablished in 1996
Defunct video game companies of Japan
Companies that have filed for bankruptcy in Japan
Japanese companies established in 1981
Japanese companies disestablished in 1996